The Shire of Purga is a former local government area in the south-east of Queensland, Australia.

History
On 11 November 1879, the Purga Division was created as one of 74 divisions within Queensland under the Divisional Boards Act 1879 with a population of 2089.

With the passage of the Local Authorities Act 1902, the Purga Division became the Shire of Purga on 31 March 1903.

The Greater Ipswich Scheme
On 13 October 1916, a rationalisation of the local government areas in and around Ipswich was implemented. It involved the abolition of five shires:
 Brassall
 Bundamba
 Lowood
 Purga
 Walloon
resulting in:
 a new Shire of Ipswich by amalgamating part of the Shire of Brassall, part of the Shire of Bundanba, part of the Shire of Walloon and all of the Shire of Purga
 an enlarged Shire of Rosewood by including part of the Shire of Walloon
 an enlarged City of Ipswich by including part of the Shire of Brassall and part of the Shire of Bundamba
 an enlarged Shire of Esk by including all of the Shire of Lowood

Chairmen
 1891: William Howarth Ackerley

References

Former local government areas of Queensland
1916 disestablishments in Australia
1879 establishments in Australia